Greg Huegel is a former American football placekicker who played for the Clemson Tigers.

Huegel was part of the Clemson team that defeated Alabama in the 2017 College Football Playoff National Championship by a score of 35–31. In the game, he converted all five extra point attempts.

References

External links
Clemson Tigers bio

1995 births
Living people
American football placekickers
Clemson Tigers football players
People from Blythewood, South Carolina
Players of American football from South Carolina